Absence is a 2014 Brazilian drama film directed by Chico Teixeira. It was screened in the Panorama section of the 65th Berlin International Film Festival.

Cast
 Matheus Fagundes as Serginho
 Irandhir Santos as Ney
 Gilda Nomacce as Luzia
 Thiago de Matos as Mudinho

See also
List of lesbian, gay, bisexual or transgender-related films of 2015

References

External links
 

2014 films
2014 drama films
2014 LGBT-related films
Brazilian drama films
Brazilian LGBT-related films
2010s Portuguese-language films
LGBT-related drama films